Annette Saint-Pierre, CM (born 29 August 1925) is a Canadian educator, writer and publisher.

Biography
She was born in Saint-Germain-de-Grantham, Quebec on 29 August 1925. She was educated at the Scolasticat Saint—Joseph in Saint-Hyacinthe and the University of Ottawa. Between 1950 and 1970, Saint-Pierre taught elementary and high school in Manitoba. In 1970, she became a professor of Canadian literature at Collège universitaire de Saint-Boniface and initiated the first university level course in Canadian literature in western Canada.

In 1978, Saint-Pierre was a founding member of the Centre d'études Franco-canadiennes de l'Ouest. In 1984, she was a director for the Regroupement des centres d'études au Canada. She was also a founding member of the first two Franco-Manitoban publishing houses, Éditions du Blé and Éditions des Plaines.

Saint-Pierre played a crucial role in preserving the birthplace of Gabrielle Roy, now a museum. In 2004, she was named to the Order of Canada.

Selected works

Autobiography
 J'ai fait ma chance (2010)

Essays
 Au pays de Gabrielle Roy (2005)
 Gabrielle Roy, sous le signe du rêve (1975)

Novels
 La fille bègue, (1982 - Re-release 2012)
 Sans bon sang, (1987)
 Coups de vent, (1990)
 À la dérive,  (2002)

Theatre
 Le rideau se lève au Manitoba (1980)

References 

1925 births
Living people
20th-century Canadian novelists
20th-century Canadian women writers
21st-century Canadian novelists
21st-century Canadian women writers
Canadian novelists in French
Franco-Manitoban people
Canadian publishers (people)
Members of the Order of Canada
Canadian women novelists